Emmett may refer to:

Places
In the United States
 Emmett, Idaho
 Emmett, Kansas
 Emmett, Michigan, a village in St. Clair County
 Emmett Charter Township, Michigan in Calhoun County
 Emmett Township, St. Clair County, Michigan
 Emmett, Missouri
 Emmett, Ohio
 Emmett, Texas
 Emmett, West Virginia

Other uses
Emmett (name)

See also
 Emmet (disambiguation)
 Emmitt, given name and surname